The Staffelberg is a mountain in Lower Bavaria, Germany.

Mountains of Bavaria
Mountains of the Bavarian Forest